Olivier Jules Richard (22 March 1836 – 7 January 1896) was a French botanist, mycologist and lichenologist who published on the anatomy and symbiosis of lichens.

A native of La Mothe-Saint-Héray, he studied law in Paris. He later served as procureur de république (prosecutor) in Marennes (1873–76), La Roche-sur-Yon (1876–85) and Poitiers (1885–91). In 1890 he became a member of the Société botanique de France.

He was an outspoken opponent of Simon Schwendener's theory of lichenization.

Publications

Articles
 1883. La synthèse byro-lichénique. 7 pp. (reprinted from Le naturaliste)
 1884. "Les céphalodies des lichens et le Schwendenerisme". Guide scientifique: Journal de l'amateur des sciences: 4 pp. 
 1887. "Encore le Schwendenerisme". Revue Mycologique 9: 98–100. (2 pp.)
 1891. Notice sur la culture de la ramie. 7 pp. (reprinted from Bulletin de la Société d'agriculture, belles-lettres, sciences et arts de Poitiers 1891, no. 309)

Books
 1877. Catalogue des lichens des Deux-Sèvres. L. Clouzot. 50 pp.
 1881. De la Culture, au point de vue ornemental, des plantes indigènes de la Vendée et des départements voisins.  de L. Gasté. 99 pp.
 1883. Étude sur les substratums des Lichens. L. Clouzot, 87 pp.
 1884. L'autonomie des lichens: ou, Réfutation du Schwendenérisme.  Lechevalier. 59 pp.
 1884. Instructions pratiques pour la formation et la conservation d'un herbier de lichens.  Lechevalier. 44 pp.
 1888. Florule des clochers et des toitures des églises de Poitiers (Vienne).  Lechevalier. 50 pp.

References

French mycologists
French lichenologists
1836 births
1896 deaths
French taxonomists
People from Deux-Sèvres
19th-century French botanists